The Bay of Aarhus, or Aarhus Bay, is a Danish waterway by Aarhus in eastern Jutland.

The Bay of Aarhus is bounded by Kalø Vig in the north, Sletterhage and Helgenæs in the east, Samsø and Tunø to the south and the east Jutland coast to the west. The bay mainly exchanges water with the Kattegat through a deep trench along Helgenæs with depths to 50 m. In the bay's southern section there are a number of stony reefs including Norsminde Flak, Wulffs Flak, Mejlflak and Tunø Knob. These reefs and the islands of Tunø and Samsø, prevents an open connection with the Belt Sea.

Environmental issues 
In 2002, the inner Danish waters suffered serious and prolonged hypoxia with the Bay of Aarhus being hit especially hard. Studies by the National Environmental Research Institute of Denmark (DMU) in November 2002 and March 2003 showed large areas with noticeable damage to marine life, especially around the areas of Kalø Vig and the western sections of the bay.

In 2013, planning for an offshore windmill park in the bay on the shallow reef of Mejlflak between Tunø, Samsø and Helgenæs was initiated, scheduled to be completed in 2017. In September 2015, the project was put on hold indefinitely as it was not found profitable for energy company NRGi.

Gallery

See also 
 Tunø Knob Offshore Wind Farm

References

External links 

Bays of Denmark
Geography of Aarhus
Kattegat